Victoria Isabella Heliodora Bundsen, also known as Victoria Boni and Victoria de Bunsen (2 March 1839 in Brastad, Bohuslän – 18 February 1909 in London) was a Swedish opera singer (alto).

She was the daughter of vice governor Fr. Bundsen and Anna Juliana Otterdahl. She was a student of the Royal Swedish Opera in 1858 and debuted there in 1861. She was a student of Jean Jacques Masset in Paris and Lamperti in Milan. In 1865–1872, she was active under the name Victoria Boni as a prima donna alto in Modena.

In 1872, she was hired at Her Majesty's Theatre in London, where she enjoyed a successful career as "madame de Bunsen".

Sources 
 Victoria Isabella Heliodora Bunsen i Adolf Lindgren och Nils Personne, Svenskt porträttgalleri (1897), volym XXI. Tonkonstnärer och sceniska artister.

1839 births
1909 deaths
Women of the Victorian era
Swedish emigrants to the United Kingdom
19th-century Swedish women opera singers
Operatic contraltos